Sępólno Krajeńskie  is a town in northern Poland, in the Kuyavian-Pomeranian Voivodeship. It is the capital of Sępólno County (Powiat Sępoleński) and Gmina Sępólno Krajeńskie.

Zempelburg was part of Greater Poland until 1772. From 1772 to 1807, it belonged to Prussia. From 1807 to 1815, it was part of the Duchy of Warsaw. The city was recaptured by Prussia and became part of West Prussia from 1815 to 1920.

In 2016, it had a total population of 15,907 with an urban population of 9,258 and rural population of 6,649.

Location
The city is located in the historical Krajna forest on a high bank of the Sępólna River. It is located 63 km northwest of Bydgoszcz (Bromberg).

History

The town formed part of the Kalisz Voivodeship of the Greater Poland Province of the Polish Crown from 1314-1793.

The town received Magdeburg rights in 1360 from King Casimir the Great of Poland.

The Catholic church, mentioned as early as 1360, suggests that it was located in the Sępólna River valley. According to legend, the castle manor was lost when the river and nearby Dziechowo lake flooded.

Sępólno was founded as a private town. It initially belonged to the Pakoski family. Later, it was owned by the Ostroróg, Goślubski, Zebrzydowski, Smoszewski, Brez and Potulicki families until 1821.

During the Thirteen Years' War between Poland and the Teutonic Knights the area was captured by the Knights and the town was looted.

Sępólno suffered during the Swedish invasions and epidemics of the 17th century.

The Evangelical church on Schulenberg was destroyed in 1620. The location of a castle mentioned in 1679 is unknown. In 1764, the Niederstadt had 79 houses and the suburbs 71.

In the 18th century, the town had a number of weavers, shoemakers and farmers. In 1773 Zempelburg had 70 craftsmen, including eight cloth makers and numerous shoemakers. A new synagogue was built in 1734. The Jews of the town traded textiles and other fabricated goods to both Royal Prussia and Duchy of Prussia. The Jewish community in Zempelburg was still active until the early 20th century.

The town was annexed by the Kingdom of Prussia during the First Partition of Poland in 1772. Fires in 1781 and 1782 destroyed 73 houses, so that there existed now 84 devastated sites in the town. In the year of 1783 the town had altogether 183 houses, most of them having thatched roofs. There was an influx of Jews, who, however, gradually emigrated westwards in the 19th century.

Sępólno was part of the short-lived Polish Duchy of Warsaw in 1807–1815 during the Napoleonic Wars, and afterwards it was re-annexed by Prussia. The Evangelical church was built in 1857-1858 and has since been demolished.

In the 19th century, Jews were obliged to give 30 Tympf, nine veal roasts, six beef roasts, six pounds of tallow, and one pound of gunpowder to the Catholic parish every year on Corpus Christi and Easter.

In 1871, the town became part the German Empire. Zempelburg formed part of the Flatow district of the province of West Prussia. It was a center for the textile and shoemaking industries. Despite Germanisation policies, Poles established various organisations, including the Bank Ludowy ("People's Bank") in 1910.

Until 1919, Zempelburg belonged to the district of Flatow in the administrative district of Marienwerder in the province of West Prussia of the German Reich. The city had 3818 inhabitants in 1910, of which 637 were Poles. In terms of religion, in 1905 there were 57.0% Protestants, 32.7% Catholics and 10.3% Jews.

After the First World War, Zempelburg had to be ceded to Poland without a referendum due to the provisions of the Versailles Treaty in 1920 for the purpose of establishing the Polish Corridor. It was incorporated into the new Pomeranian Voivodeship. The German-speaking residents of Zempelburg became the ethnic minority of German Poles. Zempelburg received the Polish name Sępólno Krajeńskie. At that time, the town was the district seat of the Sępoleński Powiats.

In 1920, the eastern part of the former Flatow district with the towns of Kamień Krajeński, Więcbork and Sępólno was reintegrated with the restored Polish Republic after the Treaty of Versailles. The town became the seat of Sępólno County.

World War II 

Sępólno was invaded by Nazi Germany on September 1, 1939, the first day of World War II, and was later annexed and made the seat of Zempelburg district within the Reichsgau Danzig-West Prussia. During the German occupation, Poles were subject to persecutions, mass arrests, Germanisation, expulsions and massacres. Numerous Poles were imprisoned in a concentration camp in Radzim and in a prison established by the Selbstschutz in Sępólno, and later murdered on site or deported to other Nazi concentration camps. Mass arrests of Poles were carried out from September 1939, and the first executions of Polish inhabitants were carried out by the Germans at the turn of September and October 1939. Mass executions of Poles in Sępólno were carried out in various places, for example on the railway tracks connecting Sępólno and Kamień Krajeński (in October 1939), at the primary school and at the shooting range (in November 1939), local Poles were also murdered in Radzim, Karolewo, Rudzki Most. Local Jews were also murdered in Radzim. In early 1945, the town was captured by the Soviets, who plundered the town, sexual abused residents, deported Germans to Siberia, and fought the Polish underground resistance movement. Afterwards the town was restored to Poland.

Landmarks of Sępólno Krajeńskie include a Protestant church in the market built in 1857.

Number of inhabitants by year

Points of interest

Notable residents
 Moritz Brasch (1843-1895), philosopher
  (born 1967), Polish international footballer
 Aaron ben Eliezer Lipman (mid-seventeenth century), rabbi

References

External links
Official town website

Literature 
 F. W. F. Schmitt: Topographie des Flatower Kreises. In: Preußische Provinzialblätter, Andere Folge, Vol. VI, Königsberg 1854, pp. 257–289 (Online) and pp. 432–461 (Online), Vol. VII, Königsberg 1855, pp. 42–46 (Online) and pp. 105–118 (Online) (in German)
 Goerke, Otto: Der Kreis Flatow. In geographischer, naturkundlicher und geschichtlicher Beziehung dargestellt. [1. Auflage: 1918] 2. Auflage, Gifhorn 1981, mit einem Nachtrag über die Zeit von 1918 bis 1945 von Manfred Vollack  (902 Seiten, 113 Abbildungen und sieben Karten) (in German) 
 Mathias Niendorf: Minderheiten an der Grenze - Deutsche und Polen in den Kreisen Flatow (Złotów) und Zempelburg (Sępólno Krajeński) 1900–1939 (PhD thesis,  University of Kiel 1996). Harrassowitz, Wiesbaden 1997,  (restricted preview, in German)
 Günter Bleck: Die deutsche Bevölkerung in den Herrschaften Zempelburg und Vandsburg 1750–1812. J. G. Herder-Bibliothek Siegerland, 1991 (in German).

Cities and towns in Kuyavian-Pomeranian Voivodeship
Sępólno County
Pomeranian Voivodeship (1919–1939)